Handlist of publications of, or about, music printed in England before 1660.
If a work is undated the date is italicised. The handlist does not give every detail about the publications (that information can be found elsewhere) but presents an overview of music publishing in England. The 1557 London Charter limited printing to members of the London Company of Stationers and this was strengthened and further enforced in 1566. (Byrd and Tallis were granted their patent on 22 January 1575).

For ease of sorting composer names are entered surname first.
The Short Title Catalogue (STC) and English Short Title Catalogue (ESTC) numbers can be used to obtain more detail; search available from the British Library HERE

References

Bibliography 
Tessa Murray, Thomas Morley: Elizabethan Music Publisher (Woodbridge, Suffolk, 2014)
R. Rasch, Music Publishing in Europe 1600-1900: Concepts and Issues Bibliography, Musical Life in Europe 1600-1900 : Circulation, Institutions, Representation (2005)
Jeremy L. Smith, Thomas East and Music Publishing in Renaissance England (2003)
R. Gameson and others, The Cambridge History of the Book in Britain: 1557-1695, Cambridge Histories Online (1998) 
Jeremy L. Smith, ‘The Hidden Editions of Thomas East’, Notes, 53/4 (1997), 1059–91
A. W. Pollard and G. R. Redgrave, editors: A Short-Title Catalogue of Books Printed in England, Scotland and Ireland, and of English Books Printed Abroad 1475–1640. Second edition, revised and enlarged, begun by W. A. Jackson and F. S. Ferguson, completed by K. F. Pantzer. London: The Bibliographical Society. Vol. I (A–H). 1986. Pp. 620. Vol. II (I–Z). 1976. Pp. 504. Vol. III (Indexes, addenda, corrigenda). 1991. Pp. 430.
Donald W. Krummel and Stanley Sadie, eds., Music Printing and Publishing (London, 1990)
Howard M Nixon, 'Day's Service Book, 1560-65' Electronic British Library Journal, 1984
Iain Fenlon and John Milsom, ‘“Ruled Paper Imprinted”: Music Paper and Patents in Sixteenth-Century England’, Journal of the American Musicological Society, 139 (1984).
David. C Price, Patrons and Musicians of the English Renaissance (Cambridge, CUP, 1981) [NB There were numerous errors or ambiguities in Price's lists, which have been disamiguated where possible, but some problems remain]
Wing: Short-Title Catalogue of Books Printed in England, Scotland, Ireland, Wales, and British America, and of English Books Printed in Other Countries, 1641–1700 by Donald Goddard Wing
Donald W. Krummel, English Music Printing 1553-1700 (London, 1975)
Donald W. Krummel, Guide for Dating Early Published Music: A Manual of Bibliographical Practices (Hackensack and Kassel, 1974)
C. Humphries and W.C. Smith, Music Publishing in the British Isles: From the Beginning until the Middle of the Nineteenth Century; a Dictionary of Engravers, Printers, Publishers, and Music Sellers, with a Historical Introduction (1970)
R. Steele, The Earliest English Music Printing: A Description and Bibliography of English Printed Music to the Close of the Sixteenth Century. London, Printed for the Bibliographical Society at the Chiswick Press, 1903, Illustrated Monographs (1903).

Early modern music
Music books